The Colin is a  long river in the department of Cher in central France. It is a tributary of the Yèvre, its waters eventually reaching the sea through the river Loire.

Geography 
The river's source is at Humbligny, where it drains La Motte d'Humbligny, the highest point in the Sancerrois region. It runs through Les Aix-d'Angillon and Sainte-Solange and joins the Yèvre at Saint-Germain-du-Puy.

Communes 

Humbligny, Morogues, Aubinges, Les Aix-d'Angillon, Sainte-Solange, Saint-Germain-du-Puy,

References 

Rivers of France
Rivers of Centre-Val de Loire
Rivers of Cher (department)